The Dubai World Trade Centre Residence is a 41-floor tower in the Dubai International Convention Centre in Dubai, United Arab Emirates.  Opened in 2008, World Trade Centre Residence is managed by Jumeirah Living. Jumeirah Living offers a mix of one to four bedroom serviced apartments within the residence for short, mid-term and extended stays. The tower has a total structural height of 158 m (518 ft). The building is a five-star residential tower alongside the Dubai World Trade Centre, Dubai's first high-rise building.  Construction of the foundation began in August 2005. The building sits on the site of the old World Trade Centre Hotel.

See also 
 List of tallest buildings in Dubai

References 

Residential buildings completed in 2008
Residential skyscrapers in Dubai
2008 establishments in the United Arab Emirates